Veera Bahu is a 2011 Kannada film in the action genre starring Duniya Vijay and Nidhi Subbaiah in the lead roles. The film has been directed and written by S. Mahendar  and produced by Sandesh Nagaraj under Sandesh Combines. V. Harikrishna has composed the music.

Plot
Vijay and Rangayana Raghu play the role of graveyard protector while Nidhi plays the role of an Iyengari girl.

Cast
 Duniya Vijay as Veerabahu
 Nidhi Subbaiah as Devi
 Vinaya Prasad
 Rangayana Raghu as Amase
 M.N Lakshmi Devi
 Raju Thalikote
A. T. Raghu

 Avinash
 Kishori Ballal

Soundtrack

Reception

Critical response 

A critic from The Times of India scored the film at 3 out of 5 stars and wrote "Hats off to Vijay for his outstanding performance as an innocent grave digger. Nidhi Subbaih excels with her excellent dialogue delivery and expressions. Rangayana Raghu has given life to his role. Music by V Harikrishna and cinematography by Ananth Urs is appreciable". Shruti Indira Lakshminarayana from Rediff.com scored the film at 1.5 out of 5 stars and says "The melodramatic and stretched climax also works against the film. Veera Bahu could have been an out of the box flick given the coming together of powerhouses like Mahender and Vijay. Sadly, though it disappoints". B S Srivani from Deccan Herald wrote "A fine performance by Rangayana Raghu, who does not go overboard, Raju Talikote’s wry humour, Anant Urs’ intelligent camerawork and excellent background score by Harikrishna all embellish Mahendar’s screenplay. Yes, the film drags on but this Veerabahu is served up with all the correct ingredients". A critic from Bangalore Mirror wrote  "Vijay, Rangayana Raghu and Avinash fall victims to the limited scope their respective characters offer. Though there are flashes of brilliance in dialogues, the overall quality remains pathetic. The film has finesse in its looks, but not in the story.For those expecting some magic from the Mahendar-Vijay combination, Veerabahu is a big let-down". A critic from DNA wrote "Rangayana Raghu does his usual act, as do Avinash and Dharma who play the usual tough cops. Raju Talikote plays a man from Hubbali who offers good repartees. Nidhi has done a good job. Watch this film, it entertains in true mass style".

References

2011 films
2010s Kannada-language films
Films scored by V. Harikrishna
Films directed by S. Mahendar